Live at the Fillmore and similar names may refer to any of the following live albums, recorded at any of the concert venues known as "the Fillmore".

Fillmore venues 
 The Fillmore in San Francisco
 The Fillmore West in San Francisco
 The Fillmore East in New York City
 The Fillmore New York at Irving Plaza in New York City
 The Fillmore Auditorium in Denver
 The Fillmore Detroit in Detroit
 The Fillmore Silver Spring in Silver Spring, Maryland

Albums with names like Live at the Fillmore

Other albums recorded at the Fillmore

References 

Lists of albums
Live albums